Hackelia brevicula is a species of flowering plant in the borage family known by the common name Poison Canyon stickseed.

Distribution
The plant is endemic to eastern California. It is native to the Inyo Mountains and White Mountains, within Inyo County and Mono County and the Inyo National Forest.

It is a listed Vulnerable species, and is on the California Native Plant Society Inventory of Rare and Endangered Plants.

Description
Hackelia brevicula is a perennial herb 20 to 60 centimeters tall and coated thinly in stiff hairs. Most of the leaves are located around the base of the plant, reaching up to 18 centimeters long; there are a few smaller leaves on the stem itself.

The inflorescence is an open array of branches, each a coiling panicle of flowers. Each flower is just over a centimeter wide with light blue lobes with white appendages at the bases. The fruit is a cluster of nutlets which are often prickly.  The bloom period is July.

References

External links
Calflora Database: Hackelia brevicula (Poison canyon stickseed)
Jepson Manual eFlora (TJM2) treatment of Hackelia brevicula
UC CalPhotos gallery

brevicula
Endemic flora of California
Flora of the Great Basin
~
~
~
Natural history of Inyo County, California
Natural history of Mono County, California
Flora without expected TNC conservation status